Arthur Cary (September 23, 1891 – May 25, 1964), alternately spelled "Carey" and nicknamed "Kid", was an American Negro league third baseman in the 1910s.

A native of Clarksville, Tennessee, Cary made his Negro leagues debut in 1915 with the St. Louis Giants. He played with the Giants through 1917, then played for the Dayton Marcos in 1918 and returned to St. Louis to finish his career in 1919. Cary died in St. Louis, Missouri in 1964 at age 72.

References

External links
 and Seamheads

1891 births
1964 deaths
Dayton Marcos players
St. Louis Giants players
Baseball third basemen
Baseball players from Tennessee
People from Clarksville, Tennessee
20th-century African-American sportspeople